An isothiazole, or 1,2-thiazole, is a type of organic compound containing a five-membered aromatic ring that consists of three carbon atoms, one nitrogen atom, and one sulfur atom.  Isothiazole is a member of a class of compounds known as azoles. In contrast to the isomeric thiazole, the two heteroatoms are in adjacent positions.

The ring structure of isothiazole is incorporated into larger compounds with biological activity such as the pharmaceutical drugs ziprasidone and perospirone.

See also 
 Isothiazolinone

References